Andreas Vogler Studio is an international and multidisciplinary firm for architecture and innovative design, with headquarters in Munich. The practice is led by its founder, Andreas Vogler and was established in 2014 shortly after he left Architecture and Vision. The practice specializes in novel solutions using technology, art, history and futurist ideas for inspiration.

Description 
Andreas Vogler Studio is an architecture and design studio based in Munich and founded by Swiss architect and designer Andreas Vogler. The studio combines the fields of Aerospace, Art and Architecture. Design is understood as a process for complex problem solving using scientific methods, technological know-how and artistic intuition. The Studio has experience in space mission planning for orbital, lunar and Mars environments.

The studio’s recent work includes the Swiss General Consulate in Munich, the residence of the General Consul of Switzerland in Munich and a new double deck High Speed Train for the United Kingdom developed with the German Aerospace Center DLR. Clients include the public and private sector.

Projects of Andreas Vogler have been exhibited in Centre Pompidou, Paris and are included in the permanent collections of the Museum of Modern Art MoMA, New York and the Museum of Science and Industry, Chicago. He is a member of the Bavarian Chamber of Architects, Deutscher Werkbund, the German Society of Architects BDA and the American Institute of Aeronautics and Astronautics (AIAA). Andreas Vogler Studio is currently involved in the transportation competition “Tomorrow’s Train Design Today” hosted by GB Railway, The Royal Institute of British Architects (RIBA), the FutureRailway Team, and the Department for Transport (DfT). On April 8, 2015, the Andreas Vogler Studio was named one of three finalists.

Projects 
2018
Design Thinking Workshop for Train Seats
2017
 Designs for Cleaning Devices
 Private Apartment in Berlin
2016 
 Aeroliner3000 Demonstrator phase.
 Swiss Residence Munich
 Interiors for Swiss Club Munich
2015
 Aeroliner3000 Feasibility Study
 Swiss-A-Loo
 EyeInTheSky - Electronic Sculpture for ArsTechnica
2014 
 "Aeroliner3000", finalist Tomorrow's Train Design Today, 2014-2016 (ongoing project), UK
 "SwissConsulate", Swiss Consulate, Munich, Germany

Competitions 
2018
 Shunde Robotics Park

2017
 UN Telecommunications Headquarter, Geneva, Switzerland
 Haus der Weimarer Republik, Weimar
 Sculptures for the Charité, Berlin
 Modern Beergarden near Bologna
 Meizu Headquarters, Zuhai, China
 Kindergarten in Winkel, Switzerland 
2016
 Church in Breslau.
 JAZZI Philosophical Landscape Park
 Verona Arena Roofing
2015
 Tomorrow's Train Design Today, 2nd Stage 
2014
Tomorrow's Train Design Today 
Cocinella - Kindergarten for St. Moritz

Awards 
iF Design Award 2018
Red Dot Award 2017
German Design Award 2017
World Changing Ideas Award, 2017 Finalist

Publications 
DLR Portal 
Bustler 
Kölner Wissenschaftsrunde 
Railway Interiors 2015 
The Engineer 
Rail Technology Magazine 
 Inventor Magazine

References

Architecture firms of Germany